was a private junior college in Yokohama City, Totsuka Ward, Kanagawa Prefecture, Japan. It was established in 1950 when the junior college system started in Japan. Two departments was started, Metallic industrial department and Chemical industrial department.

The school closed down the following year in 1951 after failing to comply with the Private School Act set under the School Education Law in Japan.

Universities and colleges in Kanagawa Prefecture
Educational institutions established in 1950
Private universities and colleges in Japan
Japanese junior colleges
1950 establishments in Japan